The Ralt RT-40, and its evolution, the Ralt RT-41, are open-wheel Formula Atlantic-spec formula race cars, designed, developed and built by British manufacturer Ralt, for the Atlantic Championship, between 1993 and 2003.

References

Formula Atlantic
Open wheel racing cars